Daut-Kayupovo (Däwıt-Qayıp) is a rural locality (a village) in Tlyaumbetovsky Selsoviet, Kugarchinsky District, Bashkortostan, Russia. The population was 141 as of 2010. There are 2 streets.

Geography 
Daut-Kayupovo is located 47 km southwest of Mrakovo (the district's administrative centre) by road. Aznagulovo is the nearest rural locality.

References 

Rural localities in Kugarchinsky District